Jacques Weber is a French actor, director, and writer.

Life and career 
Weber joined the Conservatoire national supérieur d'art dramatique at the age of 20, and won the Prix d'Excellence when he left. He joined Robert Hossein in Rheims, and began a rich theatrical career and a sporadic cinema career.

Marcel Cravenne hired him in 1970 for Tartuffe. In 1972, he was Haroun in Faustine et le Bel Été and played the role of Hugo in État de siège by Costa-Gavras. He was seduced by Claude Jade in Le Malin Plaisir (1975), and by Anicée Alvina in Une femme fatale (1976). The young actor with much sex-appeal (he appeared in Le Malin Plaisir completely naked) was in Bel Ami (1983) after the 1885 novel by Guy de Maupassant in the adaptation by Pierre Cardinal. On television, he was, among others, Le Comte de Monte-Cristo by Denys de La Patellière and Judge Antoine Rives in the show by Gilles Béhat. Noticeable on film as Comte de Guiche in Cyrano de Bergerac (1990) and Don Juan (1998), where he seduces Emmanuelle Béart. In 2008, he joined Isabelle Adjani in a televised adaptation of Figaro which he directed for France 3.

From 1979 to 1985, he appeared at the Centre dramatique national in Lyon (Théâtre du ), and from 1986 to 2001, the Théâtre de Nice, Centre dramatique national Nice-Côte d'Azur. He has starred and directed in many of the great roles of classical theatre, including Cyrano, where he excelled for many seasons.

Jacques Weber published Des petits coins de paradis in October 2009, his first work, which relates to his work as an artist and his friends.

He is married to Christine Weber and has three children: two sons, Tommy and Stanley, and one daughter, Kim.

Filmography

Theatre 
 1969 : Tchao by Marc-Gilbert Sauvajon, directed by Jacques-Henri Duval, Théâtre Saint-Georges

1970–1979 
 1971 : La Convention de Belzébir by Marcel Aymé, directed by René Dupuy
 1971 : Crime et Châtiment by Fyodor Dostoyevsky, directed by Robert Hossein, Reims
 1972 : Les Bas-fonds by Maxime Gorki, directed by Robert Hossein, Reims, Théâtre de l'Odéon
 1973 : Jean-Baptiste Poquelin directed by Jacques Weber
 1973 : Les Fourberies de Scapin by Molière, directed by Jacques Weber
 1975 : Crime et Châtiment by Fyodor Dostoyevsky, directed by Robert Hossein, Théâtre de Paris
 1976 : Le Neveu de Rameau by Denis Diderot, directed by Jacques Weber
 1977 : La Putain respectueuse by Jean-Paul Sartre, directed by Jacques Weber, Théâtre Gérard Philipe
 1977 : Le Nouveau Monde by Villiers de l'Isle-Adam, directed by Jean-Louis Barrault
 1977 : Arrête ton cinéma by Gérard Oury, directed by the author, Théâtre du Gymnase
 1978 : Maître Puntila et son valet Matti by Bertolt Brecht, directed by Guy Rétoré, Théâtre de l'Est Parisien
 1979 : The Taming of the Shrew by William Shakespeare, directed by Jacques Weber

1980–1989 
 1980 : Le Mariage de Figaro by Beaumarchais, directed by Françoise Petit and Maurice Vaudaux, Théâtre de Paris
 1980 : Les Amours de Jacques le Fataliste by Denis Diderot, directed by Francis Huster
 1980 : Deux heures sans savoir, directed by Jacques Weber
 1980 : Spartacus by Bernard-Joseph Saurin, directed by Jacques Weber
 1982 : Une journée particulière after the film by Ettore Scola, directed by Françoise Petit, Théâtre du 8e Lyon
 1983 : Le Rêve de d'Alembert by Denis Diderot, directed by Jacques Kraemer
 1983 : Cyrano de Bergerac by Edmond Rostand, directed by Jérôme Savary, Théâtre Mogador
 1985 : Deux sur la balançoire by William Gibson, directed by Bernard Murat
 1985 : À vif directed by Jacques Weber
 1987 : Monte Cristo after Alexandre Dumas, directed by Jacques Weber, Grande Halle de la Villette
 1987 : Dom Juan by Molière, directed by Francis Huster, Théâtre Renaud-Barrault
 1988 : Nocturnes after Stefan Zweig, directed by Jacques Weber, Serge Marzolff
 1988 : Le Misanthrope by Molière, directed by Jacques Weber
 1988 : Le Chant du départ by Ivane Daoudi, directed by Jean-Pierre Vincent

1990–1999 
 1991 : Seul en scène, directed by Jacques Weber
 1991 : Maman Sabouleux and 29 degrés à l'ombre by Eugène Labiche, directed by Isabelle Nanty
 1991 : L'École des femmes by Molière, directed by Jean-Luc Boutté, Théâtre Hébertot, Théâtre des Célestins
 1992 : Mystification mix of texts by Denis Diderot, directed by Jacques Weber
 1993 : La Mégère apprivoisée by William Shakespeare, directed by Jérôme Savary
 1995 : Le Tartuffe by Molière, directed by Jacques Weber, Théâtre de Nice
 1996 : La Tour de Nesle by Roger Planchon after Alexandre Dumas, directed by Roger Planchon, Théâtre de Nice, TNP Villeurbanne
 1996 : Gustave et Eugène after Gustave Flaubert, directed by Jacques Weber, Arnaud Bédouet
 1997 : La Tour de Nesle by Roger Planchon after Alexandre Dumas, directed by Roger Planchon, Théâtre Mogador
 1998 : Une journée particulière after the film by Ettore Scola, directed by Jacques Weber, Théâtre de Nice, Théâtre de la Porte-Saint-Martin
 1999 : La Controverse de Valladolid by Jean-Claude Carrière, directed by Jacques Lassalle, Théâtre de l'Atelier

2000–2009 
 2000 : La Vie de Galilée by Bertolt Brecht, directed by Jacques Lassalle, Théâtre national de la Colline
 2002 : Phèdre by Jean Racine, directed by Jacques Weber, Théâtre Déjazet
 2002 : Le Limier, by Anthony Shaffer, directed by Didier Long, Théâtre de la Madeleine
 2003 : Jacques Weber raconte... Monsieur Molière ! after Mikhaïl Boulgakov
 2004 : L'Évangile selon Pilate by Éric-Emmanuel Schmitt, directed by Christophe Lidon, Théâtre Montparnasse
 2004 : Seul en scène, Théâtre de la Gaîté-Montparnasse
 2004 : Ondine by Jean Giraudoux, directed by Théâtre Antoine (with Laetitia Casta and Vytas Kraujelis)
 2006 : Cyrano, adapted by Christine Weber, directed by André Serre, Théâtre de la Gaîté-Montparnasse
 2006 : Love letters by Albert Ramsdell Gurney, directed by Sandrine Dumas
 2007–2008 : Débats 1974–1981, after the televised debates between Valéry Giscard d'Estaing and François Mitterrand for the Presidential elections of 1974 and 1981, directed by Jean-Marie Duprez, Théâtre de la Madeleine
 2008 : Sacré nom de dieu by Arnaud Bédouet after the correspondence of Gustave Flaubert, directed by Loïc Corbery, Théâtre de la Gaîté-Montparnasse
 2009 : César, Fanny, Marius after Marcel Pagnol, adapted and directed by Francis Huster, Théâtre Antoine
 2009 : Seul en scène, Théâtre Marigny

Audiobooks 
 2004 : Le Joueur d'échecs, by Stefan Zweig, Éditions Thélème, Paris, 2005

Honours 
 Chevalier of the ordre national du Mérite
 1992 : Officer of the ordre des Arts et des Lettres
 1996 : Chevalier of the Légion d'honneur, promoted to officer on 2008

Awards and nominations 
 1991 : César Award for Best Supporting Actor at the  Awards, for Cyrano de Bergerac

References

External links 

 
  Jacques Weber at Radioscopie, on the site of the INA : 18 February 1975 and 29 October 1980

1949 births
Living people
Male actors from Paris
French film directors
Officiers of the Légion d'honneur
Knights of the Ordre national du Mérite
French theatre directors
French male film actors
French male television actors
French male stage actors
French National Academy of Dramatic Arts alumni
Cours Florent alumni
20th-century French male actors
21st-century French male actors
French male screenwriters
French screenwriters
Best Supporting Actor César Award winners